Ricardo Jorge Marques Duarte (born 14 February 1982), known as Mangualde, is a Portuguese retired footballer who played as a right back, and is the manager of Grupo Desportivo Mangualde. He was born in Mangualde, Viseu District, Portugal.

Football career
After an unsuccessful stint in Sporting CP's youth academy (never going past the reserves after turning a senior), Mangualde represented Clube Oriental de Lisboa. In the summer of 2005 he signed for Primeira Liga club F.C. Paços de Ferreira, where would be regularly used throughout his three-season stint; he played 23 matches, all as a starter, as the northern team finished sixth in the 2006–07 campaign and qualified to the UEFA Cup for the first time in their history.

In 2008, Mangualde joined S.C. Freamunde in the second division, moving to Cyprus with Doxa Katokopias FC after just one year.

External links

1982 births
Living people
People from Mangualde
Portuguese footballers
Association football defenders
Primeira Liga players
Liga Portugal 2 players
Segunda Divisão players
Sporting CP B players
Clube Oriental de Lisboa players
F.C. Paços de Ferreira players
S.C. Freamunde players
C.D. Tondela players
Cypriot First Division players
Doxa Katokopias FC players
Girabola players
C.R. Caála players
Lusitano FCV players
Portugal youth international footballers
Portuguese expatriate footballers
Expatriate footballers in Cyprus
Expatriate footballers in Angola
Portuguese expatriate sportspeople in Cyprus
Portuguese football managers
Sportspeople from Viseu District